The Great Theatre of Dutch Painters and Paintresses, or De groote schouburgh der Nederlantsche konstschilders en schilderessen, as it was originally known in Dutch, is a series of artist biographies with engraved portraits written by the 18th-century painter Arnold Houbraken. It was published in three volumes as a sequel to Karel van Mander's own list of biographies known as the Schilder-boeck. The first volume appeared in 1718, and was followed by the second volume in 1719, the year Houbraken died. The third and last volume was published posthumously by Houbraken's wife and children in 1721. This work is considered to be a very important source of information on 17th-century artists of the Netherlands. The Schouburg is listed as one of the 1000 most important works in the Canon of Dutch Literature from the Middle Ages to today.

Background and influence
The Schouburg was not the first sequel to Karel van Mander's work. Various authors had attempted to illustrate Van Mander's work and in 1649, Jan Meyssen published Image de divers hommes in imitation of Anthony van Dyck's Iconography. Cornelis de Bie published his Het Gulden Cabinet in 1662, André Félibien published his Entretiens sur les vies et sur les ouvrages des plus excellents peintres anciens et modernes in 1666, and these were followed by Jacob von Sandrart's illustrated Teutsche Akademie in 1668. Houbraken was very familiar with Inleyding tot de Hooge Schoole der Schilderkonst, 1678, published by his teacher Samuel van Hoogstraten for students of art. Roger de Piles published L'Abrégé de la vie des peintres in the 1690s followed by Florent le Comte with his Cabinet des singularitez in 1699. As a gifted engraver, Houbraken wished to correct mistakes and omissions in these earlier works, while updating biographies with engraved portraits of artists. All of these works were used as sources for Houbraken and he mentions them in the first chapter of his first volume.

The Schouburg was published in three volumes, the first of which was simply meant as an addendum to Karel van Mander's work, and listed about 200 artists born between 1466 (starting with Erasmus) and 1613 (ending with Jacques van Artois) that had been omitted or whose lives extended beyond Van Mander's 1604 publication date. The popularity of this volume was such that a second volume was prepared immediately, while plans were made to continue the project up to the period in which Houbraken was writing at the start of the 18th century.

While leaning heavily on the sources already mentioned, Houbraken also consulted local history books of various cities in the Netherlands. Other, unpublished sources for his material came from various contacts via his professional network, mostly members of St. Luke Guilds in Holland. He listed many men who became members of the Bentvueghels group in Rome while on their Grand Tour, but he also listed most of the men in a competency list drawn up by Vincent van der Vinne before he died in 1702. Houbraken kept to a system of importance where capitals meant very important, and lower case were honorable mentions. Though the capitalized names were meant for the index, the index of the first volume was far from complete at the time of publication. A later edition of all three books in 1756 contains an improved index and this book is now available online in the Digital library for Dutch literature.

Volume I
The engraved portraits included as illustrations in Volume I are below, followed by the artists listed in order of appearance in the text. The first illustration is of Houbraken himself.

Desiderius Erasmus
David Joris
Cornelis Antonisz
Jan de Hoey
Bernard van Orley
Michael Coxcie
Dirk Crabeth & Wouter Crabeth I
Dirk de Vrye
Joan Dac
Johannes Snellinks
Isaac Nicolai
Adam van Noort
Otto van Veen
Jan de Waal
Adrian Nieuwland
Abraham Bloemaart
Tobias Verhaeght
Michael Mierevelt
Paulus Moreelse
Jan van Kuik Woutersze
Sebastiaan Franks
Adam Elshaimer
Lucas Franchoys the Elder
Hendrik Gaud
Roelant Savry
Adam Willaarts
Aart Druivestein
Jacob Willemsz Delff
Petrus Paulus Rubens
Pieter Soutman
Samuel Hofman
Jan van Hoek
Marten Pepyn
Abraham Janszen
Horatius Gentilesco
Hendrik van Balen
Frans Snyders
Joan Breugel
Adrian van Stalbemt
Daniel Blok
Frans Hals
Deodatus del Mont
Pieter Lastman
David Teniers
Hendrik van der Borght
Wencelaus Koeberger
David Baili
Pieter de Valk
Willem van der Vliet
Guiliam Nieulandt
Christiaan Jansz van Biezelingen
Gasper de Krayer
Cornelis Poelenburg
Alexander Keerings
Joris van Schoten
Nestus Thoman
Pieter Feddes
Hendrik Terbruggen
Adrian van der Venne
Johan Torrentius
Daniel Seghers
Adriaan van Linschoten
Lucas de Waal
Wybrand de Geest
Gerard Honthorst
Peter Snayers
Adrian de Bie
Christoffel Schovarts
Cornelis de Wael
Jacques Jordaens
Hendrik Berckman
Lucas van Uden
Dirk van Hoogstraten
Jacques Francart
Pieter Mierevelt
Leonard Bramer
Jan van der Brugge
Jan van Goyen
Pieter Pietersz Deneyn
Roelant Rogman
Pieter Saenredam
Salomon de Bray
Adrian van Uitrecht
Hubertus Grimani
Anthony van Dyk
Jodocus de Momper
Johannes van Ravesteyn, Cornelis de Vos, Adam de Koster, Daniel Mytens, Artus Wolfart, Theodorus van Loon
Jan Lis
Joan de Heem
Johan Parcellus
Jan Pinas & Jacob Pinas
Pieter de Molijn
Warnard van den Valkert
Remigius van Rheni
Lowys de Vadder
Marten Rykaard
Andries van Artvelt
Jacob van Es
Willem Backereel & Gillis Bakkereel
Joannes Wildens
Pieter van de Plas
Jacobus de Geest
Pieter Neefs
Theodoor Babuer
Cristoffel van der Laan & Jacob van der Laan
Hendrik de Klerk
Anthoni Salart
Justus van Egmont
Philips de Champanje
Pieter Koek van Aelst
Evert van Aelst & Willem van Aelst
Jan van Bronkhorst
Nicolaes Knufter
Johannis Cossiers
Simon de Vos
Joan Bylert
Pieter van Asch
Kristiaen van Kouwenberch
Daniel van Heil
Jacob Gerritsz. Cuyp
Aelbert Cuyp
Pieter Dankers de Ry
Peter Franchoys
Luigi Primo (Ludowicus)
Rembrandt van Rijn	
Paudiss
Frans Wulfhagen
Juriaan Ovens
Monniks (Monix)
Jan van den Velde
Esaias van den Velde
Joachim von Sandrart
Emanuel de Witt
Pieter van der Willigen
Abraham van Diepenbeek
Jan T. van Ieperen
Theodoor van Tulden
Paulus de Vos
Erasmus Quellinus II
Carel Erpard
Jan Lievens
Ferdinand Bol
Palamedes Palamedesz Stevers
Anna Maria van Schurman
Margarita Godewyk
Adriaen Brouwer
Joost van Craasbeek
Jacob Bakker
Bartram de Fouchier
Herman Zachtleven
Cornelis Zachtleven
Willem van Bemmel
Salomon Koning
Jan Baptist van Heil
Robert van Hoek
David Teniers
Adriaen van Ostade & Isaac van Ostade
Cornelis Bega
Leendert van der Koogen
Willem van den Velde
Johannes Mytens
Emelraad
Pieter Janszen
Thomas Willeborts Bossaert	
Otto Marcelis
Pieter van Laar
Nicolas de Helt Stokade
Abraham Willaerts
Jacques van Artois

Volume II
The engraved portraits included as illustrations in Volume II are below, followed by the artists listed in order of appearance in the text.

Gerrit Dou
Nicolas van der Hek
Marten Heemskerk van der Hek
Bartholomeus van der Helst
Jacques Wabbe
Jan Albertsz Roodtseus
Bonaventuur Peeters
Franciscus Wouters
David Rykaert
Lucas Franchoys the Younger
Frans Menton
Mathys van den Berg
Thomas van Wyk
Govert Flink
Pieter Pietersz Nedek
Nicolas Latombe
Hans Jordaans
Gillis Schagen
Ludolf de Jong
Pieter de Hoogh
Gonzalo Coques
Peter Lely	
Juriaan Jacobze
Robert van Hoeck
Antoni Waterloo
Jan Philip van Thielen
Carel van Savoyen
Philip de Koninck
Zacharias Paulusz
Jacob Delff
Jan Babtist van Duinen
Adrian Verdoel
Jan de Groot
Philip Wouwerman
Jan Baptista Weeninx
David Beck
Joan Couper
Gelsdorf
Simon Peter Tilmans
Hendrik Martensz
Jan Duive
Dirk Meerkerk
Jacob Reugers Blok
Jan Donker & Pieter Donker
Cesar van Everdingen
Jan van Everdingen
Albert van Everdingen
Adam Pynaker
Cornelis de Man
Gerbrant van den Eekhout
Joris van Son
Emanuel Murant
Wallerant Vaillant
Jacob van der Does
Theodor Helmbreker
Nicolas Berchem
Jan Both & Andries Both
Johan Torrentius
Paulus Potter
Hercules Segers
Johannes van Kessel
Johannes Peeters
Peter Boel
Joannes van Heck
Philippus Fruytiers
Antonius Goebouw & Franciscus de Neve
Joannes Fyt
Peeter Tysens
Gerrit van Hoochstadt
Gysbrecht Thys
Johannes Lingelbag
Jan Worst
Willem van Drillenburg
Jacob Lavecq
Samuel van Hoogstraten
Mathias Withoos
Hendrik Graauw
Pieter van Roestraten
Hendrik Verschuring
Willem Verschuring
Jacob van der Ulft
Jan Teunisz Blankhof
Barent Graat
Josef Oostfries
Klaas van der Meulen
Katharina Oostfries
Jan Slob
Vincent van der Vinne
Maria van Oosterwijck
Geertje Pieters
Willem Kalf
Cornelis Bisschop
Jacobus Bisschop
Abraham Bisschop
Peter van Breda
Janson van Keulen
Gerard Pieterz van Zyl
Michiel Willemans
Willem Doudyns
Ary van der Kabel
Ludolf Bakhuizen
Benjamin Blok
Anna Katrina
Kristoffel Pierson
Bartholemeus Meyburg
Katharina Rozee
Willem Schellinks
Nicolaes Maes
Johan Hendrik Roos
Filip Roos	
Theodor Roos
Juriaan van Streek
Hendrik van Streek
Carel Emanuel Biset
Ottomar Elger
Gerard Uilenburg
Jan de Baan
Jacobus de Baan
Willem van den Velde
Frederik de Moucheron
Pieter Gallis
Gasper van den Bos
Adam Frans van der Meulen
Joan G. Bouwer
Cornelis Kik
Cornelis Brizé
Frans Post	
Johan van Nes
Jan van Hoeck
Pieter Frits

Volume III
The engraved portraits included as illustrations in Volume III are below, followed by the artists listed in order of appearance in the text.

Frans van Mieris
Jan Steen
Jan Linsen
Gabriel Metzu
Johannes Spilberg
Wilhelm Breekvelt
Jan Hakkert
Pieter van Anraat
J Weyerman
Rombout van Trojen
Carel de Jardyn
Willem Drost, van Terlee & Willem de Poorter
Jacob Gellig
Spalthof & Broers
Martinus Zaagmolen
Johannes Buns
Jan Asselyn
Jacob van Ruisdael & Salomon van Ruisdael
Ludowyk Smits
Melchior de Hondekoeter
Mathys Harings
Johan van Neck
Johan Visscher
Heiman Dullaart
Joan van der Heyden
Abraham Minjon
Isak Ducart
Justus van Pee
Cornelis Cornelisz
Adrian van den Velde
Dirk van Bergen
Gasper Netscher
Abraham Genoels
Anna Maria, Françoise Katharina, and Maria Theresa van Thielen
Gerard de Laires
Barent Appelman
Pieter van Slingelant
Ary de Vois
Jacob Torenvliet
Isaac Paling
Johannes van Haansbergen
Eglon van der Neer
Godfrid Schalken
Gabriel van der Leeuw
Abraham van Kalraat
Jan van Aken
Pieter Molyn
Dirk Freres
Adriaan Bakker
Horatius Paulyn
Gysbert Verhoek
Job Berkheyde & Gerard Berkheyde
Johannes Vorstermans
Johan Soukens
Joris van der Haagen
Francisco Milet
Arent de Gelder
Joan Baptist de Champanje
Albert Meyering
Michiel van Musscher
Joan de Biskop
Ary Huibertsz Verveer
Hubert van Ravestein
Johannes Glauber
Jan Gotlief Glauber
Maria Sybille Merian
Johannes Voorhout
Mathys Neveu
Jacob Denys
David van der Plaas
Daniel Syder
Godfried Kneller & Johan Zacharias Kneller
Jan van Kessel
Gerard Hoet
Johannes Bronkhorst
Abraham Diepraam
Josef Mulder
Mathys Wulfraat
Johan van Hugtenburgh
Jacob Moelaert
Jan Luiken
Romein de Hooge
Jan van Nikkelen
Augustinus Terwesten
Johannes Verkolje
Ugaart Delvenaar & Jacob Koning
Johannes van der Bent
Pieter Reuven
Matheus Wytman
Marienhof
Johan van der Meer	
Barent van Kalraat
Johanna Koerten
Rochus van Veen
Dirk van Delen
Abraham de Heusch
Cornelis van der Meulen
Johan Starrenberg
Jacob de Wolf
Guilhelmo van Ingen
Nicolas de Vree
Abraham Hondius
Francoys Dancx
Jan van Alen
Abraham Stork
David Colyns
Barent Gaal
Isaac Koene
Pieter van der Hulst
Pieter Peuteman
Jan Klaasz Rietschoof
Hendrik Rietschoof
Cornelis Holstein
Simon van der Does
Theodorus & Christoffel Lubienietzky
Jan Hoogzaat
Carel Fabritius
Johan van Bunnik
Carel de Moor
Jan Frans van Douven
Simon Germyn
Willem Beurs
John Closterman
Jan Griffier
Cornelis Huysmans
Willem Wissing
Guiliam de Heus
Jacob de Heus
Philip Tideman
Ernst Stuven
Elias van den Broek
Laurens van der Vinne
Paulus van Hillegaart & Pieter de Ruelles
Jacob van Campen
Hendrik Carree
Bernart Schendel
Antony Vreem
Dirk Dalens
Michiel Maddersteg
Justus van Huisum
Adrian van der Werf

Notable omissions
The absence from Houbraken's work of several painters who are now much more highly regarded than very many painters he considered noteworthy, is an interesting feature of the work, and reveals changes in taste since his time; the most notorious omission is Jan Vermeer, who is mentioned once in passing.  One must not forget however, that Houbraken himself died before publishing the final work, and he mentions again and again the impossibility of a complete list. In his first volume he includes painters that he complained were oversights by Karel van Mander, who he regarded as his greatest example. He highly respected all artist biographers who came before him, such as Sandrart, de Bie, and de Lairesse. In fact, Houbraken was quite keen to include painters that he thought were overlooked before him, and was quite thorough in his endeavors. Therefore, his omissions are equally the omissions of previous biographers, though it is Houbraken who receives all the blame. Unfortunately we don't know the exact state of his book at the time of his death, but his son Jacob, his daughter Antonina, and his wife all helped to patch things up for publication, and it is quite possible that their own opinions slipped into the finished work. In general, Houbraken tends to follow the contemporary prejudices of the hierarchy of genres and undervalue landscapists, marine artists and painters of still life. One can also speak of certain prejudices of the Houbraken family. These were in order:

 Family dynasties: All painters who made up a family dynasty received extra space in the book. More space was given to the founder of the dynasty than to any other member (note that Houbraken considered himself the founder of his own family dynasty). An example is that though Rachel Ruysch was the most famous painter of her family, Houbraken devotes more space to her grandfather Pieter Post and his brother Frans. Similarly, though Wouter Crabeth II was the most famous painter of the family, Houbraken devotes more space to his illustrious heritage in Gouda, the glass painters Dirk and Wouter.
 Engravers: Houbraken had a business of his own in biographical engravings, and his large family probably all helped in the business, with his son and daughter helping with the oval portraits. Houbraken was quick to realize the importance of reprints, and used them whenever possible for art provenance. He highly respected good engravings. Therefore he was heavily prejudiced towards artists who were also good draftsmen and engravers, such as Rembrandt and the Visschers. He includes also notes about various publishers and engravers, who did not paint at all.
 Rome: Houbraken had great respect for all artists who took the trouble and overcame many hardships to travel to Rome. He went to great pains to add entries for the entire list of painters mentioned in a poem about the Bentvueghels.
 Flattery: As a Mennonite, Houbraken would have been against flattery; however, he writes again and again of the importance of flattering one's patrons in his books, and a recurring theme is when an artist fell onto bad times because he failed to flatter his patron. This type of artist is admired by Houbraken as a sort of "martyr to the artist's cause". Examples of flatterers that Houbraken deprecates are Anthony van Dyck  and Sir Peter Lely followers, and his omissions speak for themselves if we note famous portrait painters of his day such as Adriaen Hanneman, Johannes Cornelisz Verspronck and Thomas de Keyser. Similarly, though architecture was considered one of the highest genre's, the popular "family portrait with a view of the house or garden" was omitted as a genre entirely from Houbraken's praise, since this just showed off the wealth of the sitters. Thus landscape-portraitists were often omitted or deprecated, such as Hendrik van Steenwijk II and his wife.
 Religion: Certainly Houbraken included artists of all religions in his book, but we can say that Mennonites are over-represented (see his story on the Mennonite martyr Jan Woutersz van Cuyck), while Catholics are under-represented. These were the De Grebbers, the De Brays, the Ruisdael family, Jan Vermeer, Adriaen Coorte, Adriaen Hanneman, Johannes Cornelisz Verspronck, Hendrick Dubbels, Pieter Anthonisz. van Groenewegen, Meindert Hobbema, and others.

Other notorious omissions are Jan van de Cappelle, Judith Leyster, Jan Wynants, Jacobus Mancadan,  Hendrick Avercamp, and others.

Schilderessen
Translated, the title of the book is Theatre of Painters and Paintresses, indicating that Houbraken wrote about women painters, or schilderessen. However, the list of women he included in the book is really quite short. Though he included short biographies of very many painters who were closely related to women painters, the only paintresses he included by name were: Artemisia Gentileschi, Anna Francisca de Bruijns, Mayken Verhulst, Anna Maria van Schurman, Margaretha van Godewijk, Maria de Grebber (sister of Pieter de Grebber), Maria Potter, Alida Withoos, Catharina Oostfries (from a glaspainting family, married glasspainter Claes van der Meulen), Maria van Oosterwijck, Geertgen Wyntges (who he mentions as being the servant of Maria van Oosterwijck), Anna Katrina, Catharina Rozee (1632–82), Adriana Spilberg (daughter of Johannes Spilberg), Rachel Ruysch, the three sisters Anna Maria van Thielen, Françoise Katharina van Thielen, and Maria Theresa van Thielen, Marie Duchatel, Diana Glauber, Maria Sybilla Merian, Margaretha Wulfraet, and Johanna Koerten Blok. Of these, he included illustrations of only three women: Schurman, Merian, and Koerten-Blok. Houbraken also mentioned two poetesses; Gesina Brit and Catharina Questiers.

References

Schouburg in the Digitale Bibliotheek der Nederlandse Letteren (DBNL, "Digital library for Dutch literature")
Schouburg on Google books (Edition from 1721)

External links

1718 books
1719 books
1721 books
Art history books
Biographies about artists
Dutch biographical dictionaries
Dutch biographies
Houbraken